Khalil-ur-Rehman Qamar  is a Pakistani writer, director, Urdu poet, lyricist and occasional actor known for writing such dramas as Pyarey Afzal (2013), Sadqay Tumhare (2014) and most recently the top-rated Meray Paas Tum Ho (2019-2020), as well as the 2019 ISPR-produced film Kaaf Kangana.

Early life and career
Khalil ur Rehman Qamar was born in 1962 in Lahore, Punjab, Pakistan. He studied in a government high school in Shad Bagh, Lahore. He used to write in school too and did further studies in B.Com. MBA.

He started his  TV drama career with Dastak Aur Darwaza and later produced a film Qarz (1997) which he also wrote. He also wrote the dialogues of Ghar Kab Aao Gay (2000), Tere Piyar Mein, Mukhra Chan Varga, Nikki Jai Haan but made his breakthrough with Boota from Toba Tek Singh (1999). Later, he used this style in his dramas Landa Bazar (2002) and Love, Life Aur Lahore. Khalil ur Rehman Qamar has written various drama serials but he is best known for his all time super hit dramas such as Pyarey Afzal (2013), Sadqay Tumhare (2014), and Meray Paas Tum Ho (2019).

Personal life 
He wrote a drama serial Sadqay Tumhare which is based on his own real life love story during his teenage days.

Khalil worked at the National Bank of Pakistan but retired as he wanted to pursue a writing career.

In 1985, Khalil married his first wife Rubi Naz.

Khalil ur Rehman married his second wife Rozina Qureshi, while being married to Rubi. Rozina is an actress & was previously married to actor Faysal Qureshi. Khalil ur Rehman has a step daughter Hanish Qureshi, from Rozina's marriage to Faisal and has two children of his own with Rozina.

His son Aabi Khan is an actor.

Controversies 
In mass media and live television panel discussions relating to women's rights issues, Khalil-ur-Rehman Qamar supported conservative positions.

On March 3, 2020, Khalil-ur-Rehman Qamar appeared on a Pakistani talk show on Neo News to discuss the Aurat March. When Qamar was speaking, Marvi Sirmed interrupted Qamar by shouting "Mera Jism Meri Marzi" (meaning "My Body My Choice"). Qamar getting frustrated by the interruption, began calling her shameful. Agence France-Presse reported that Qamar said to Sirmed that "no one would even spit on your body" and that she was a "cheap woman" who should "shut up". Qamar was heavily criticized by politicians and prominent figures, while Geo TV suspended his contract. Qamar said he was not stating anything, at the time of her speech, but she interrupted him.

Films

Television

References

External links 

1956 births
Pakistani dramatists and playwrights
Pakistani male television actors
Pakistani film directors
Urdu film producers
Pakistani lyricists
Punjabi people
Living people
Pakistani Muslims
Pakistani Sunni Muslims
Pakistani Islamists
Urdu-language poets from Pakistan